Wazamono is a classification of Japanese swords and swordsmiths used in Japan to identify historic blades of exceptional quality. According to the first edition of Kaiho Kenjaku (懐宝剣尺) published in 1797, There are 163 Wazamono swords in total, grouped into four categories based on their quality. Twelve swords are classified as Saijō Ō Wazamono (Supreme Grade), twenty-one swords are classified as Ō Wazamono (Excellent), fifty swords are classified as Yoki (Ryō) Wazamono (Very Good), and eighty swords are classified as Wazamono (Good).

This rating is based on a book compiled by Yamada Asaemon V (山田浅右衛門吉睦), an official sword cutting ability examiner and executioner of the Tokugawa shogunate, and is an authoritative index of cutting ability of Japanese swords. The list of ratings concerning swordsmithing differs between Kaiho Kenjaku (懐宝剣尺) published in 1797 and the reprinted edition published in 1805, and the major revised edition of Kokon Kajibiko (古今鍛冶備考) published in 1830. Add up the number of sword smiths in each edition: Saijo Ō Wazamono 15, 'Ō Wazamono 21, Yoki Wazamono 58, Wazamono 93, lower 3 grade mixed 65.

The list of swordsmiths described below is the swordsmiths described in the first edition of Kaiho .

Twelve Saijō Ō Wazamono
There are 12 blades that hold the rank of Saiju Ō Wazamono (Supreme Grade). This is the highest classification of Wazamono. Nagoya Japanese Sword Museum Touken World.
  = Hidemitsu II
  = Masaie IV
 

  =  I
  =  Kotetsu II  = Kanemoto I
  =  Kanemoto  II
 
  = Nagamichi I
 
 
 Hizen Tadayoshi III = 

Twenty-one Ō Wazamono
There are 21 blades that hold the rank of Ō Wazamono (Excellent). This is the second highest classification of Wazamono.
 
 
 
 
 
 
 
 
 
 
 
 
 
 
 
 
 
 
 
 
 

Fifty Yoki (Ryo) Wazamono
There are 50 blades that hold the rank of Yoki Wazamono (Very Good). This is the third highest classification of Wazamono.
 
 
 
 
 
 
 
 
 
 
 
 
 
 
 
 
 =
 
 
 
 
 =
 
 
 
 
 
 = 
 
 
 
 
 
 
 
 
 
 
 
 =
 
 
 
 =
 
 
 
 
 
 
 
 
 
 
 
 
 

Eighty Wazamono
There are 80 blades that hold the rank of Wazamono (Good). This is the lowest classification of Wazamono''.
  =?
 
 
 
 
 
 
 
 , son of  Kanekuni (added below)
 =
 
 
 
 
 
 =?
 =?
 
 
 
 
 
 
 
 

 
  of 
 
  =?, successor of Sukehiro I (Soboro) above.
  = 
 = = =
  = 
 ==
 
 =
 
 
 
 
 
 
 
 
 
 
 
 
 
 
  =
 
 
 
 
 
 
 =?
 
  ==
 
 =?
 =
 
 =
 
 
 
 
 
 =

Mixed
Swordmakers that produced a mixture of quality, ōwazamono, ryōwazamono, or wazamono. 65 in this category.

References

, German and Ja names.

Wazamono
Wazamono
Wazamono